Richard Grayson (born 1958) is a British artist, writer and curator. His art practice encompasses installation, video, painting and performance. He investigates ways that narratives shape our understandings of the world. His art and curatorial practice focus on narrative and the visual arts, belief systems and material expression, and ways cultural practices allow translation between the subjective and social/political realms.

Career
Grayson was a founder member of the Basement Group(1979–1984) in Newcastle upon Tyne. The Basement group was an artists' collective that focused on experimental time based and performance art practices. It has been described as  "unique in this country [the United Kingdom] in combining two functions: it is an 'exhibiting society' for a group of six artists working in time based media (mostly performance and video), and it has up to the present provided a venue for any performing artist wishing to present work [in Newcastle]."

Grayon's work has been exhibited at Matt's Gallery, London; SMART Project Space, Amsterdam; Art Unlimited at Art Basel 2005, Switzerland; Museum of Contemporary Art Australia; Artpace, San Antonio, Texas and included in the 17th Biennale of Sydney 2010, "THE BEAUTY OF DISTANCE: Songs of Survival in a Precarious Age" and ARSENALE 2012: The First Kiev International Biennale of Contemporary Art 2012, entitled "The Best of Times, The Worst of Times. Rebirth and Apocalypse in Contemporary Art".

Key works include: "Messiah"
, 2004, "Intelligence"
, 2005, "Ghost Houses", 2004–2007, "The Golden Space City of God", 2009, "The Magpie Index", 2010, a video focusing on legendary singer-songwriter Roy Harper, "The Magic Mountain" 2013, and "Possessions_inc", 20016-19 

His critical writing has been published by Art Monthly, UK and Broadsheet, Australia.
He has written catalogue essays and monographs on Mark Wallinger, Roy Harper, Mike Nelson, Susan Hiller and Suzanne Treister.

Between 1992 and 1998, he was Director of the Experimental Art Foundation in Adelaide, Australia.

Grayson was Artistic Director of the 2002 Biennale of Sydney, titled '(The World May Be) Fantastic', which investigated 'artists and practices using fictions, narratives, invented methodologies, hypotheses, subjective belief systems, modellings, fakes and experiments as a means to make works.'. Writing in Art in America in October 2002, Michael Duncan said of the exhibition that it "gave free rein to complex, often offbeat works predicated on alternate realities. Artists included: Mike Nelson, Chris Burden, Susan Hiller, Vito Acconci, Eleanor Antin, Henry Darger, Janet Cardiff and Rodney Graham.  In an article in the Sydney Morning Herald from 17 May 2002, Bruce James describes the exhibition as "a hit".

Grayson curated A Secret Service: Art, Compulsion, Concealment in 2006/7, a Hayward Gallery Touring Exhibition; This Will Not Happen Without You: (Basement to Locus + 1975-2007) in 2006–2007, Arts Council of England Touring exhibition, Polytechnic in 2010 for Raven Row, London, REVOLVER, a series of co-collaborations with Robin Klassnik at Matt's Gallery, London in 2012 and Worlds in Collision, the 3rd Adelaide International in 2014.

Grayson is currently a visiting lecturer at the Ruskin School of Art, University of Oxford, The Royal College of Art, London and holds the position of Bartlett Research Fellow at Newcastle University, UK

Writing - art catalogues

References

External links 
Richard Grayson official site
Richard Grayson at Matt's Gallery, London
Richard Grayson, SMART Project Space, Amsterdam
Richard Grayson publications: Intelligence
Artfacts.Net: Richard Grayson' international gallery guide for modern, contemporary and emerging art.

Living people
1958 births
British curators
British installation artists
British performance artists
English contemporary artists